The Schafberg is a mountain peak above Boltigen located on the border between the cantons of Fribourg and Berne, north of Jaun. With a height 2,239 metres above sea level, it is the highest summit on the range lying north of the Jaun Pass. It is also the most isolated mountain in the canton of Fribourg.

See also
List of most isolated mountains of Switzerland

References

External links
Schafberg on Hikr

Mountains of Switzerland
Mountains of the Alps
Mountains of the canton of Fribourg
Mountains of the canton of Bern
Bern–Fribourg border
Bernese Alps
Two-thousanders of Switzerland